Ricardo García (3 April 1926 – 10 March 2008) was a Mexican cyclist. He competed in the individual and team road race events at the 1952 Summer Olympics.

References

External links
 

1926 births
2008 deaths
Mexican male cyclists
Olympic cyclists of Mexico
Cyclists at the 1952 Summer Olympics